The Armenia–Iran border is 44 km (27 mi) in length and runs from the tripoint with Azerbaijan’s Nakhchivan region in the west to the tripoint with Azerbaijan proper in the east.

Description
The border starts in the west at the western tripoint with Nakhchivan, Azerbaijan and runs along the Aras river to the eastern Azerbaijan tripoint. East of this the border continues along the Aras eastwards.

History 
During the 19th century the Caucasus region was contested between the declining Ottoman Empire, Persia and Russia, which was expanding southwards. By the Russo-Persian War (1804–1813) and the subsequent Treaty of Gulistan, Russia acquired the bulk of what is now Azerbaijan and parts of Armenia; a border was drawn along the Aras river which is the modern border between Iran and Azerbaijan (excluding the Nakhchivan section) and Iran and Armenia. Following the Russo-Persian War (1826–1828) and the Treaty of Turkmenchay Persia was forced to cede Nakhchivan and the rest of Armenia; the Aras was extended as the border up to the Ottoman tripoint, thus finalising what would become the Azerbaijan-Iran border.

During the First World War Russian Communists staged a successful revolution in 1917, whilst the peoples of the southern Caucasus had declared the Transcaucasian Democratic Federative Republic in 1918. Internal disagreements led to Georgia leaving the federation in May 1918, followed shortly thereafter by Armenia and Azerbaijan. In 1920 Russia's Red Army invaded Azerbaijan and Armenia, ending the independence of both, followed shortly thereafter by Georgia. All three states were incorporated into the Transcaucasian SFSR within the USSR, before being separated in 1936. An Iran-USSR border convention in 1954 made some minor adjustment along the frontier in the Azeri sections of the border to Iran's benefit. On-the-ground demarcation then followed, with a final agreement being agreed upon in 1957.

Following the collapse of the USSR in 1991 Armenia gained independence and inherited its section of the Iran-USSR border.

Border crossings
The main crossing is at Nurduz-Agarak.

Settlements near the border

Armenia 

 Agarak
 Meghri
 Alvank
 Shvanidzor

Iran 

 Duzal
 Qulan
 Nowjeh Mehr
 Pir Bolagh

See also
 Armenia–Iran relations

References

 
Iran
Borders of Iran
International borders